Blas Monaco (November 16, 1915 – February 10, 2000) was an American professional baseball player who had a long career (1935–1944; 1946–1949) in minor league baseball interrupted by two brief  Major League trials almost nine years apart with the Cleveland Indians in  and .

Career
Monaco appeared in only 17 games in the Major Leagues, and collected two hits in 13 at bats, with one extra-base hit, a triple, and two runs batted in. His two hits and lone RBI came in his big league debut on August 18, 1937, at Sportsman's Park against the St. Louis Browns.  In that game, Monaco pinch hit for starting second baseman John Kroner and went two-for-two and played errorless ball in the field, in an 11–6 Cleveland defeat. He would go hitless in his remaining 11 MLB at bats (five in 1937 and six in 1946), starting his only game as a second baseman four days after his debut, and going 0-for-4  against Vern Kennedy of the Chicago White Sox. However, he again made no errors in the game, which was won by the Indians, 3–2.

During his minor league career, Monaco played in over 1,400 games.

References

External links

1915 births
2000 deaths
American expatriate baseball players in Mexico
Baltimore Orioles (IL) players
Baseball players from San Antonio
Cedar Rapids Raiders players
Cleveland Indians players
Dallas Eagles players
Diablos Rojos del México players
Fargo-Moorhead Twins players
Kansas City Blues (baseball) players
Major League Baseball second basemen
Newark Bears (IL) players
Oklahoma City Indians players
New Orleans Pelicans (baseball) players
Seattle Rainiers players
Springfield Indians (baseball) players
Wilkes-Barre Barons (baseball) players